Obakeng Ambrose Ngwigwa (born 9 July 1985 in Serowe) is a Botswana sprinter.

He won the bronze medal over 400 metres at the 2004 World Junior Championships in Athletics with a personal best and national junior record of 45.97 seconds. Obakeng also competed in the 400 metres at the 2006 Commonwealth Games running a time of 47.67 seconds to give him an overall place of 32nd.

From 2006 to 2007, Ngwigwa ran for the Butler Community College track team, winning the 2008 Kansas Relays in the 400m, and the 2008 Texas Relays in the 100m.

In 2008, he joined the University of South Carolina track team, participating in multiple solo and team events, and was named to the Outdoor All-SEC First Team and the Indoor All-SEC Second Team during the 2009-10 season.

References

External links
 

1985 births
Living people
People from Serowe
Botswana male sprinters
Athletes (track and field) at the 2006 Commonwealth Games
Athletes (track and field) at the 2010 Commonwealth Games
Commonwealth Games competitors for Botswana
African Games bronze medalists for Botswana
African Games medalists in athletics (track and field)
Athletes (track and field) at the 2011 All-Africa Games